This is a list of mayors that served the city of Soltvadkert, Hungary.

 ??–?? Gyula Havasi
 ??–1990Károly Nagy
 1990–2006 László Berkecz
 Since 2006 Ferencz Lehoczki

See also

 List of Hungarians#History and politics
 List of people from Bács-Kiskun
 Lists of mayors by country

Soltvadkert
Bács-Kiskun County